Josef Gockeln (March 18, 1900 – December 6, 1958) was a German politician of the Christian Democratic Union (CDU) and former member of the German Bundestag.

Life 
He was one of the co-founders of the CDU in Düsseldorf. In 1945/46 he was chairman of the Program Commission of the Rhineland Regional Association.

Gockeln became a member of the state parliament of North Rhine-Westphalia in 1946 and remained a member of parliament until his accidental death in 1958. On 19 May 1947 the state parliament elected him as its president. He also held this office until 1958. Gockeln was a member of the German Bundestag from the first federal election in 1949 until his death. He was directly elected in the constituency of Düsseldorf II in 1949 and in the neighbouring constituency of Düsseldorf I in 1953 and 1957.

Literature

References

1900 births
1958 deaths
Members of the Bundestag for North Rhine-Westphalia
Members of the Bundestag 1957–1961
Members of the Bundestag 1953–1957
Members of the Bundestag 1949–1953
Members of the Bundestag for the Christian Democratic Union of Germany
Members of the Landtag of North Rhine-Westphalia